Events in the year 2022 in Bosnia and Herzegovina.

Incumbents
President: Milorad Dodik, Šefik Džaferović and Željko Komšić (until 16 November); Denis Bećirović, Željka Cvijanović, Željko Komšić onwards
Prime Minister: Zoran Tegeltija

Events
Ongoing – COVID-19 pandemic in Bosnia and Herzegovina

February

 25 February – Protesters gather in Sarajevo, to stand in solidarity with Ukraine.

April
22 April – 2022 Bosnia and Herzegovina earthquake: One person killed and 14 injured.

May 

 25 May – Several bomb threats are made via email to schools and government institutions in Sarajevo Canton, Bosnia and Herzegovina, prompting evacuations. No bombs have been found.

July 

 3 July – Bosnia and Herzegovina reports its first confirmed case of monkeypox.

August 

 6 August – Twelve people are killed and 32 others are injured when a bus carrying pilgrims from Poland to Medjugorje, Bosnia and Herzegovina, crashes in Podvorec, Croatia.

October 
2 October – 2022 Bosnian general election: Bosnians head to the polls to elect the three members of their ethnically shared government. The Party of Democratic Action emerged as the largest party in the House of Representatives, winning 9 of the 42 seats.

November 

 16 November – Denis Bećirović, Željka Cvijanović, Željko Komšić assume their roles as the Presidency of Bosnia and Herzegovina.

December 
 13 December – The European affairs ministers of the European Union agree to upgrade Bosnia and Herzegovina's application status, formally recognising the country's candidacy to join the union. The European Council will officially grant this status on 15 December.
 15 December – Accession of Bosnia and Herzegovina to the European Union: The European Council formally grants candidate status to Bosnia and Herzegovina.

Deaths

May
1 May – Ivica Osim, professional football manager and player (b. 1941).

References

 
2020s in Bosnia and Herzegovina
Years of the 21st century in Bosnia and Herzegovina
Bosnia and Herzegovina
Bosnia and Herzegovina